Renato Bayma Archer da Silva (10 July 1922 – 20 June 1996) was a Brazilian naval officer and politician. The Centro de Pesquisas Renato Archer (CenPRA), a federal R&D center located in Campinas, state of São Paulo, is named in his honour.

As a politician, he served as a vice-governor and federal representative to the state of Maranhão. He was known for his strong defense of the Brazilian nuclear power program. He served also as minister of science and technology during José Sarney's government.

See also
 List of mayors of São Luís, Maranhão

External links
 Biography. CPDOC (Fundação Getúlio Vargas). In Portuguese.
 Centro de Pesquisas Renato Archer. Home page.

1922 births
1996 deaths
Members of the Chamber of Deputies (Brazil) from Maranhão
Brazilian Democratic Movement politicians
Brazilian Social Democracy Party politicians
Ministers of Science and Technology of Brazil